Sir John Henry Harris Davis (10 November 1906 – 27 May 1993) was an English businessman and accountant. He was the managing director, later chairman, of the Rank Organisation.

Early life
John Davis was born in the London in 1906 to Sidney Myring Davis and Emily Harris. He was educated at the City of London School.

Career
Davis became a member of the Chartered Institute of Secretaries, and was secretary to a number of companies before joining Odeon Theatres in 1938 as an accountant, becoming managing director of the Rank Organisation in 1948. He was largely responsible for Rank's consolidation of film production at Pinewood Studios and steered the company away from a financial crisis in 1949 and into a stronger financial position by diversifying the group's business. In 1962, Davis became chairman, succeeding the retiring J. Arthur Rank. Davis was knighted in 1971 and retired from the company in 1977.

Personal life
Davis married five times. He married Joan Buckingham in 1926, with whom he had a son; Marion Gavid in 1947, with whom he had two daughters, Susan and Janet; actress Dinah Sheridan in 1954 (marriage dissolved 1965) and Felicity Rutland in 1976. He died in Westminster, London on 27 May 1993.

References

1906 births
1993 deaths
Businesspeople awarded knighthoods
Knights Bachelor
People educated at the City of London School
People from the City of London
20th-century English businesspeople